The Badger Bus is an interurban bus line operating mainly in Wisconsin by Badger Coaches, Inc. It also offers charters and tours, and operates school buses under contract.

History
Founded in 1920 by Herman E. Meier to provide service between Madison and Monroe, Wisconsin, the company expanded after it was granted permission in 1946 to provide service between Madison and Milwaukee. The company may have also been known as Badger Tour and Travel. 

In 2023, Badger Bus lost a contract with the Madison Metropolitan School District to transport its students in school buses.

Routes 
Badger Bus mainly provides intercity service from Milwaukee, Wisconsin to Madison, Wisconsin. Badger Bus also provides weekend service from Madison to Minneapolis, Whitewater, and Eau Claire.

Fleet 
As of 2015, Badger Bus has 140 vehicles with a combined capacity of 7,000 people.

The Badger Bus fleet consists of several buses:
Blue Bird Vision
IC Bus

See also
 List of intercity bus stops in Wisconsin

References

External links
Badger Coaches home page

Bus transportation in Wisconsin
Intercity bus companies of the United States
Transport companies established in 1920
Bus companies of the United States
1920 establishments in Wisconsin
Transportation companies based in Wisconsin